Sládek (feminine Sládková) is a Czech surname meaning a maltster. Notable people with the surname include:

 Bohumil Sládek, Czech sprint canoer
 Jan Sládek, Czech gymnast
 John Sladek (1937–2000), American science fiction author
 Josef Václav Sládek, Czech writer
 Michael Sladek (born 1947), German doctor, bearer of the Bundesverdienstkreuz (husband of Ursula)
 Miroslav Sládek (born 1950), Czech politician
 Republicans of Miroslav Sládek, political party in the Czech Republic
 Pavel Sládek, Czechoslovak biathlete
 Peter Sládek, Slovak footballer
 Ursula Sladek, German renewable energy activist (wife of Michael)

Czech-language surnames
Occupational surnames